"Lisa the Beauty Queen" is the fourth episode of the fourth season of the American animated television series The Simpsons. It first aired on the Fox network in the United States on October 15, 1992. In the episode, Homer enters Lisa into a beauty pageant to boost her confidence. Lisa is runner-up, but gains the title of Little Miss Springfield after the original winner is injured. Little Miss Springfield's duties include being a spokesperson for Laramie Cigarettes, which causes Lisa to speak out against smoking. As a result of her anti-smoking protests, her title is taken away on a technicality.

The episode and its accompanying songs and music was written by Jeff Martin and directed by Mark Kirkland where Bob Hope made a guest appearance. The episode references various films, music, and historical events and was well received by critics.

Plot
Springfield Elementary School holds a school fair, where Lisa purchases a caricature of herself drawn at a carnival booth. She is horrified at the unflattering drawing and the reaction of the surrounding crowd, and feels she is unattractive. Homer wins the fair's raffle, with the grand prize being a ride in the Duff Blimp. He later sees on TV that Laramie Cigarettes is sponsoring this year's "Little Miss Springfield" pageant, and decides to enter Lisa to boost her self-esteem. The entry fee for the pageant is $250, so he sells his Duff Blimp ticket to Barney to raise the funds needed. Homer excitedly tells Lisa about the pageant, but she is reluctant until Marge tells her that Homer sold his Duff Blimp ticket to pay the entry fee. Realizing her father's sacrifice, she enters the pageant.

At the pageant's registration, Lisa meets a formidable competitor named Amber Dempsey, a blonde girl who uses eyelash implants from Paraguay to make herself look cuter. In preparation for the pageant, Lisa receives makeovers at the beauty parlor and encouragement from her family. The day of the pageant arrives, and onstage Lisa explains her aim to make Springfield a better place, and her talent is a jazzy medley of "America the Beautiful" and "Proud Mary", while Amber wins the crowd's adoration by batting her large eyelashes. After Krusty the Clown's interview segment, Amber is announced as the winner with Lisa the runner-up. At Amber's first official appearance, a thunderstorm creates a lightning bolt which strikes her metal scepter. She is hospitalized for her injuries, and Lisa is crowned Little Miss Springfield.

One of Little Miss Springfield's duties as spokesperson for pageant sponsor Laramie Cigarettes, is to lure a younger demographic into smoking. Instead, Lisa protests against the dangers of cigarettes at her appearances, and also vows to target the corruption of Mayor Quimby. Quimby and the Laramie officials look for a way to dethrone and silence Lisa. They find a technical error on her entry form: Homer wrote "OK" underneath the instruction "Do not write in this space". As Amber is recrowned Little Miss Springfield, Homer is upset that he cost Lisa her title, but Lisa reminds Homer that he entered her in the pageant to help her self-esteem, and thanks him because it worked. Homer requests that she remember it "the next time I wreck your life", to which Lisa gladly agrees and embraces him.

Production
Many of The Simpsons''' writers had left the show or were absent at the beginning of season four, which left Al Jean and Mike Reiss to brainstorm plot ideas alone. After brainstorming "Homer the Heretic", they thought of Lisa entering a beauty pageant. They assigned Jeff Martin to write the episode because they assumed he would fill it with songs, like he had done on previous episodes. Martin obliged, and wrote the episode and its music. He also based the episode on some of his own experiences, such as the scene where Lisa has a caricature of herself drawn. Regarding the topic, Martin stated, "I'm not sure if we could do this episode today. People had a more innocent view of child beauty pageants before JonBenet Ramsey." According to Reiss, the pitch session of the joke on how Homer got Lisa disqualified took longer than any session he could remember, with Frank Mula eventually pitching the winning gag.

This episode featured then-89-year-old Bob Hope as a guest star, with his part recorded at his house by screenwriters Jeff Martin and Conan O'Brien. His appearance is based on his younger, Vietnam War-era self.

Cultural references
The episode makes two references to Star Wars, where the caricature artist displays a caricature of Darth Vader and a montage shows Lisa with a double-bun hairdo like Princess Leia. When Barney crashes the Duff Blimp the pose it takes makes reference to the Hindenburg disaster. Laramie's mascot Menthol Moose is a parody of Joe Camel. When Lisa is sworn in as Little Miss Springfield on her front lawn, Marge is to her left wearing a pink suit-dress in a pose similar to that of Jacqueline Kennedy in the famous photo of Lyndon B. Johnson being sworn in on Air Force One after John F. Kennedy's assassination.

Reception
The episode finished 28th in the Nielsen ratings for the week of October 12–18, 1992 with a rating of 12.0, seen by approximately 11.1 million households.

The authors of the book I Can't Believe It's a Bigger and Better Updated Unofficial Simpsons Guide, Warren Martyn and Adrian Wood, said: "Another top-notch episode" and adds that "Krusty gets some of his best lines in a few brief appearances." The episode's reference to Apocalypse Now was named the 29th greatest film reference in the history of the show by Total Film's Nathan Ditum.

Legacy
The Church of England's book Mixing it up with The Simpsons'', which encourages children to reflect on life issues, explores self-image through "Lisa the Beauty Queen".

References

External links

The Simpsons (season 4) episodes
1992 American television episodes
Television episodes about beauty pageants
Beauty pageant parodies
Airships in fiction